Crevasse rescue is the process of retrieving a climber from a crevasse in a glacier. Because of the frequency with which climbers break through the snow over a crevasse and fall in, crevasse rescue technique is a standard part of climbing education.

The basic assumption of crevasse rescue is that two or more climbers are tied together with a climbing rope, forming a rope team; a standard number is three, one on each end and one in the middle, which means there are two available to hold a falling climber, but is not as complicated  to manage as large numbers of people attached to a single rope.

When the snow gives way under the victim, the others on the team must immediately prepare for the impending yanks, usually by flopping down and digging ice axes and knees (or boots if not wearing crampons) into the snow in a self-arrest position, facing away from the crevasse if possible, and holding tight until everything stops moving. Many crevasses are small or slanted, and the fallen climber may be able to escape by digging or wiggling out; but if the climber is hanging in midair, one of several rescue techniques will need to be used.

The first step is to stabilize the situation and free up the climbers still outside the crevasse. This can be done in several ways, typically involving one person anchoring the rope with a boot-axe belay, while the other person probes for the edge of the crevasse and attempts to communicate with the victim.

 The main force technique is plausible when there are multiple rope teams; everybody simply hauls on the rope attached to the victim, drawing it over an axe shaft or other hard object so the rope friction does not cut a deep groove at the edge of the crevasse making it harder for the climber to get out.
 The Z-pulley technique is a moderately complicated arrangement using a small moving pulley to reduce the hauling effort.
 The single-pulley technique entails dropping a pulley attached to another length of rope, which the victim clips to the climbing harness.
 If the climber in the crevasse is able to move, he or she may be able to use prusik hitches with slings, cordelette, or Jumars to ascend the rope. The related bilgeri technique involves the use of a second rope, and prusik hitches by the rescuers instead of the victim.

Once the victim reaches the lip of the crevasse, some combination of hauling and flailing will be needed to get over it, since the victim is still suspended by the waist, with feet still in the crevasse.

Although the mechanical principle of rescue is simple, the reality is far messier. The victim may be injured and/or disoriented from the fall, the rescuers on the scene may be anxious or uncertain, equipment and ropes are scattered everywhere, and everybody will likely already be exhausted and out of breath because of the climbing and altitude. It may also be that additional crevasses are nearby, and rescuers have died in unsuspected crevasses because they unroped in order to set up a rescue of the first victim.

The experience of world-class climbers Jim Wickwire and Chris Kerrebrock on Mount McKinley (since renamed Denali) in 1981 shows how much can go wrong. Only a two-person team, when Kerrebrock fell in, Wickwire was pulled in after. Wickwire managed to get out of the crevasse, but Kerrebrock was jammed in the bottom, head down. Wickwire tried to pull him out, but his shoulder had been dislocated, and he didn't have the strength; Kerrebrock eventually died of hypothermia, and Wickwire had to run the gauntlet of the remaining crevasses alone.

References
 Mountaineering: The Freedom of the Hills

Mountaineering techniques
Rescue